Ambrose of Alexandria (before 212 – c. 250) was a friend of the Christian theologian Origen. Ambrose was attracted by Origen's fame as a teacher, and visited the Catechetical School of Alexandria in 212.  At first a gnostic Valentinian and Marcionist, Ambrose, through Origen's teaching, eventually rejected this theology and became Origen's constant companion, and was ordained deacon. He plied Origen with questions, and urged him to write his Commentaries (treating him as "" in Commentary on John V,1) on the books of the Bible, and, as a wealthy nobleman and courtier, he provided his teacher with books for his studies and secretaries to lighten the labor of composition.

He suffered during the persecution under the Roman emperor Maximinus Thrax in 235. He was later released and died a confessor. The last mention of Ambrose in the historical record is in Origen's Contra Celsum, which the latter wrote at the solicitation of Ambrose.

Origen often speaks of Ambrose affectionately as a man of education with excellent literary and scholarly tastes. All of Origen's works written after 218 are dedicated to Ambrose, including his On Martyrdom, Contra Celsum, Commentary on St. John's Gospel, and On Prayer. Ambrose's letters to Origen (praised by Jerome) are lost, although part of one exists.

Veneration
Ambrose is venerated as a saint by some branches of Christianity. His feast day in the Catholic Church falls on 17 March.

References

Saints from Roman Egypt
Egyptian theologians
3rd-century Egyptian people
250 deaths
Christian anti-Gnosticism
3rd-century Christian saints
Year of birth uncertain